Ernest Gaskell Sterndale Bennett,  (May 30, 1884 – April 9, 1982) was an actor and theatre director in Canada.

Born in London and a grandson of the English composer Sir William Sterndale Bennett, he was educated at Derby School and in 1904 qualified with first class honours as a civil and mechanical engineer from the Central Technical College of the City & Guilds of London Institute. In 1905 he emigrated to Canada and began working in amateur theatres in Moose Jaw, Medicine Hat and Lethbridge.  In 1923 he founded and directed the Lethbridge Playgoers Club and later the Alberta Drama Festival upon which the Governor General the Earl of Bessborough later based the Dominion Drama Festival.

Abandoning his career as an engineer in favor of the theatre, he moved to Toronto in 1933 to become a professional actor, director, teacher, adjudicator and consultant.  He was a director of the T. Eaton Dramatic Club, later renamed The Toronto Masquers Club.  Several of his students won major awards.

During the Second World War he served as a munitions inspector for the British Admiralty Technical Mission. In 1945 he returned to Toronto to create the drama department of the Royal Conservatory of Music and in 1949 co-founded the Canadian Theatre School, the only establishment of its type in the country.

In December 1974 he was appointed a Member of the Order of Canada for services to the theatre. He died in Toronto on April 8, 1982 just two months before his 98th birthday.

In his memory, the Sterndale Bennett Theatre in the Genevieve E. Yates Memorial Centre in Lethbridge, Alberta was opened on April 21, 1990. It was renovated and reopened in 2021

References

2023

 Mann, Dr George (2004) Sterndale Bennett - A Man for all Theatre (Lethbridge Historical Society)
 Bridge City News accessed January 18, 2023
 Canadian Broadcasting Corporation. Accessed 20 January 

1884 births
1982 deaths
Canadian male stage actors
Canadian theatre directors
British emigrants to Canada
Members of the Order of Canada